"Monggeumpo Taryeong" (IPA pronunciation: moŋ.ɡɯːm.pʰo.tʰaːrjŋ) is a representative Korean folk song (minyo ) of the northwestern areas of the Hwanghae and Pyeongan provinces of North Korea. The song describes the lives of local fishermen and the surrounding port, village, hills, and scenery. The song is about lovers in a beautiful harbor who wait and sing for the return of their loved ones, who are sailors. 

The harbor in the song is Monggeumpo Harbor in Jangyeon-gun (administrive division), near the Jangsangot mountain range in Hwanghae Province. It is sung in a nasal tone to connote sorrow and melancholy. The song was composed by Kim In-sook, and first became popular in the late Joseon dynasty due to social change. The song follows the Jungmori Jangdan beat, which is also used in pansori and sanjo. The song can also be played in the slower Gutgeori Jangdan beat, which also fits its rhythm and tone.  An alternative name for the song is "Jangsangot Taryeong".

History 
"Monggeumpo Taryeong" originated in the Hwanghae and Pyeongan regions of Korea. The song's musical features can be traced to the local folk song "Anju Aewongok" from the Pyeongan region. "Monggeumpo Taryeong" first became more widely popular in the late Joseon Dynasty due to social change, and became a part of city entertainment culture. The song's verses were first confirmed in the Joseon Japgajip,, which the publishing house Shinguseorim published in 1918.  "Monggeumpo Taryeong" is the subject of Kim Seong-tae's 1944 Capriccio for Symphonic Orchestra. In the early 21st century, the song is used as musical curriculum in textbooks used in South Korean schools, and is sung as an arranged choral song. Gugak (national songs) such as "Monggeumpo Taryeong", however, may be removed from textbooks in the future. Modern singers sing "Monggeumpo Taryeong" due to its popularity.

Composition 
"Monggeumpo Taryeong" is unique because it differs from the rhythm and beat of other folk songs of the Hwanghae and Pyeongan provinces. The song is based on Seodo folk songs but it also shows the slight influence of Western music because the melody progression is different. It does not follow the typical features of regional sushimgatori but instead uses the ban-gyeongtori style. Because "Monggeumpo Taryeong" is easier to sing than other Seodo folk songs, it said to be more popular. On the Western scale of musical notes, the song uses five pitches; D, F, G, A, and C. The D note is the modal center, the F note is performed in a descending manner, the G note is performed with downward vibrato, and the A is played with an ascending vibrato. In Seodo folk terminology, the musical use of this kind of song is called bansushimgatori. The verses are performed in four jangdans and the refrain in two jangdans (beat/tempo). The lyrics and refrain of the song may slightly differ in each version.

Background 

The harbor in the song is Monggeumpo Harbor in Jangyeon-gun, Hwanghae Province, North Korea. Monggeumpo Harbor is situated on a beach, and surrounded by hills that are covered with red rugosa roses. The sand is described as being fine and silk-like in quality, and has the names  Baeksa, Geumsa, Myeongsa (鳴), and Myeongsa (明). It is called Myeongsa (鳴) because of the sound made when walked on barefoot. The sand is said to blow into dunes because it is thin. The nearby ocean water is described as clear and beautiful.

Korean philosopher Yi I described the harbor and beach as: 
송림 사이 거닐다 보니 낮 바람 시원하고
금모래에서 놀다 보니 어느덧 석양이 지는구나
천년 지나 아랑의 발길 어디서 찾을 것인가 
고운 주름 다 걷히니 수평선은 더욱 멀어라

Which translates to:
As I walk among the pine trees, the daytime wind is cool.
After playing in the golden sand, the sunset will set sooner or later;
After one thousand years, where will I find Arang's footsteps?
All the fine creases are gone (sand?), the horizon is even farther away.

The Jangsanggot mountain range was named from its description as extending deep into the Yellow Sea (Seohae, 서해). In the Joseon Dynasty, Arangpoyeong and Jonipojin were installed at the harbor, and it served as an important, strategic location for national defense when Joseon Navy forces were deployed.  is located to the southeast of Monggeumpo; American missionary Etherwood first discovered and developed the sacred scenery of that place. Within the lyrics, "bongjuk" appears.

Lyrics 

The refrain of "Monggeumpo Taryeong" is repeated after every verse. In some versions, the refrain may be slightly different each time it is sung. There are multiple versions of the song, with slightly differing lyrics and refrain.

In Hwanghae Province, bongjugeul badattda means catching a large quantity of fish to fill a boat. In Pyojuneo, bongjuk usually means "porridge" or "receiving assistance".

See also 
 Pansori
 Doraji Taryeong
 Sae Taryeong
 Arirang
 Music of Korea

Notes

References

External links 
 Watch the National Gugak Center perform "Monggeumpo Taryeong" --> 
 Watch Yoo Ji-sook perform "Monggeumpo Taryeong" --> 
 Watch RabidAnce perform "Monggeumpo Taryeong" --> 

Korean traditional music
Korean-language songs